James Randall Corrigan (10 July 1865 – 19 March 1935) was a New Zealand Liberal Party Member of Parliament, farmer and businessman.

Biography

Born at Woodend, North Canterbury, Corrigan was a very successful farmer in the North Island, and breeder of sheep, cattle and trotting horses. He died in Hāwera aged 69 years.

James Corrigan represented the Patea electorate in the New Zealand House of Representatives between 1922 and 1925.

A daughter, Dorothy Corrigan, married the Independent MP for Nelson, Harry Atmore, in 1936.

External links

References

Ministers and Members in the New Zealand Parliament Edited by G.A. Wood (1996, Otago University Press, Dunedin)

1865 births
1935 deaths
New Zealand Liberal Party MPs
New Zealand farmers
People from Woodend, New Zealand
Unsuccessful candidates in the 1925 New Zealand general election
20th-century New Zealand politicians
20th-century New Zealand businesspeople